Peter George Urban (August 14, 1934 – April 7, 2004) was an American martial artist. Called "The George Washington of American Karate" by Kick Illustrated magazine, and "The Godfather of American Goju" by Official Karate magazine. Urban was the founder of the karate style known as American GōJū Ryū Karate Do (USA GoJu Karate). He was one of only a small number of white students under Gōgen Yamaguchi, an early Japanese GōJū Ryū Sensei, Practitioner, and Instructor as well as the head of the style's organization, The GoJu Kai. Controversially, Urban created an American style of Gōjū-ryū without the permission of Yamaguchi who would not allow Urban to represent Japanese Karate in America as head representative for the GoJu Kai.

Early life 
Urban was born in Jersey City Medical Center in Jersey City, New Jersey, on August 14, 1934. He lived a short while in Altoona, Pennsylvania, then was raised and educated in Union City, New Jersey, where as a boy he shined shoes and delivered the local newspaper, The Hudson Dispatch. At this point in his life he had shown an acute interest in the Martial Art Science of JiuJitsu and American boxing. He graduated from Emerson High School in Union City in 1952 and thereafter joined the United States Navy.

US Navy duty in Japan 
Urban began studying the martial arts while serving in the US Navy in  Yokohama, Japan. He apprenticed with Richard Kim in 1953 and became his Uchideshi (house student). He was transferred to Tokyo in 1954 to continue his training with Kim, who introduced Urban  to teachers Masutatsu Oyama, founder of the Kyokushin Kai and Gogen Yamaguchi, founder of Zen Nippon GoJu Kai. In 1954, Yamaguchi accepted Urban as his student. Urban trained with Oyama in 1955. When he left Japan in 1959 he had advanced to 5th degree black belt, which was granted by Yamaguchi.

Return to the US 
In 1959, Urban moved to America and introduced GōJu Ryū to the east coast of U.S.  He opened his first GōJu Ryū DoJo on 14th Street and Summit Avenue in Union City, N.J. The following year he shared a school in Manhattan which was owned and operated by the Lephofker brothers before moving his classes to 20 E. 17th street in NYC. By 1964, Urban relocated to downtown locations in NYC’s Chinatown; Canal Street, Crosby Street, Wooster Street and Williams Street in the Financial District, respectively.  Urban was also responsible for establishing structured tournaments with the use of a point system in America. The first of these was the 1st North American Karate Championships held at Madison Square Garden in 1962.

1964 visit to Japan 
In 1963-64, Urban traveled back to Japan to seek Yamaguchi’s consent to create an official GoJu Ryu club in America and planned to remain for several years hoping to obtain higher rank. Yamaguchi refused his request and the relationship between the men fell apart. Urban quoted: “The feudal system still exists in Japan, they have lost the true spirit, their system builds blind followers and I believe karate should build seekers not followers.” Urban returned to San Francisco and spent time training with Richard Kim; who promoted Urban to 6th degree black belt.

in 1967, Peter Urban published his now famous, "The Karate DoJo: Traditions and Tales of a Martial Art," and by the beginning of the following year he would incorporate as, "Peter Urban Karate Inc." and would establish "USA GoJu Karate," as his DBA.

Back in the US 
Urban continued to work under Richard Kim and the BuTokuKai but later went on to form his own U.S.A. GoJu Association (U.S.A.G.A) which is still in operation. Several students have been given permission by Urban to teach and continue to propagate the Urban System.  Urban trained hundreds of well-known martial artists such as: Frank Ruiz, founder of Nisei GoJu-Ryu, Alberto Gotay, founder of World Goju, Sekwii Sha, founder of Goju Shanando,  William Louie, founder of Chinese American Goju, Leon Wallace, founder of Harlem Goju, John Kuhl, founder of Combat Karate, Ron Van Clief, founder of Chinese Goju, Harry Rosenstein, founder of Kanzen Goju-Ryu, Ronald Taganashi, founder of American-Te Goju-Ryu, Manny Saavedra, founder of Sansei Goju-Ryu, Chaka Zulu, founder of ZuJitsu-Ryu, Carlos Paris, founder of Yoshi Goju-Ryu, Anthony Lau, founder of Ying Yee Kwoon, Arcelio Rullan, founder of Rullan Goju-Ryu, Raymond A. Fitzpatrick, founder of Nisei Goju-Jitsu, Lou Angel, founder of Tenshi Goju-Ryu, Ric Pascetta, founder of American Goju Karate Association International, Joseph Hess, founder of Tactical GoJu, Dayton Guinee, founder of American Heritage Goju Karate-Do, James Chellemi, founder of New York Goju Karate Association , Frederick "Skipper" Ingham, founder of Bermuda Goju, Orlando Soto, Sr. founder of Golden Fist Goju-Ryu, Joseph Kelljchian, founder of USA GoJu Federation and more. 
 
Notables who trained with Urban are: Khemforia Padu, David McConnell, Gerald Orange, Robert Jones, Edward Verycken, Edward Doyle, Thomas Boddie, Ulysses Edwards, George Matthews,  Earl Monroe, Louis Delgado, John Giordano, John Waples, Owen Watson, Earl Woodbury, Hanni Sakas, Gianfranco Giacometti, Walter Parks, John Hooker, Keith Teller, Kevin McGrath, James Price, William Myers, Rick Diaz, Barry Hankerson, Walter Tigner, Sheldon Wilkens, Thomas Bennett, James Zeno, Wilfredo Roldan, Michael Robinson, William Grady, Kevin Grady, Henry “Butch” Williams, Balfour Wright, Ray Hermann, Sinclair Throne, Sensei Montalban, Claudio Gonzalez, Joe Lopez, Joe Hess, Garry Gascoyne, Aaron Banks, Chuck Merriman, Kevin Nordlande, Walter Platt, Joseph Kelljchian, GJ Torres, Steven Malanoski and more.

Awards
Urban received several awards, including Black Belt Magazines 2003 Hall of Fame Man of the Year.

References

External links 
 "The Karate Dojo" by Peter Urban First Book
 American GoJu Official Website
 

1934 births
2004 deaths
20th-century philanthropists
People from Jersey City, New Jersey
People from Union City, New Jersey
Sportspeople from Hudson County, New Jersey
American male karateka
Gōjū-ryū practitioners
Martial arts school founders